The 2000–01 Sussex County Football League season was the 76th in the history of Sussex County Football League a football competition in England.

Division One

Division One featured 16 clubs which competed in the division last season, along with four new clubs. 
Clubs promoted from Division Two:
Arundel
Lancing
Sidlesham
Plus:
Chichester City United, formed as merger of Chichester City and Portfield

League table

Division Two

Division Two featured 14 clubs which competed in the division last season, along with four new clubs.
Clubs promoted from Division Three:
Bosham
Crowborough Athletic
Wealden
Plus:
Shoreham, relegated from Division One

League table

Division Three

Division Three featured 13 clubs which competed in the division last season, along with two new clubs:
Rye United, joined from the Kent County League
TSC

League table

References

2000-01
2000–01 in English football leagues